Hello! The Osmond Brothers is an album released by The Osmonds in 1970.  Most songs were recorded in Japanese, and some were recorded in English.  The album was released in Japan. Four singles were released from the album. Chitchana Koibito, Young Love Swing, Movin' Along and Chance.  The single, Chitchana Koibito, (which means "My Little Darling" in Japanese) was sung by Jimmy and reached No. 1 on the Japan charts.  The album was released about a month before they signed with MGM Records.

Track listing

Charts

References

1970 albums
The Osmonds albums